Laura Perico (born September 29, 1989 in Bogotá, Colombia) is a Colombian actress.

Telenovelas

2019  Los Internacionales

2019 Jugar con Fuego ..Andrea

2019 Bolivar...Elsa
2016 –  La Niña... Juliana
 2015 – Narcos...Marina Ochoa
 2014 – La Suegra .... Carolina López de Burgos
 2012 – ¿Dónde está Elisa? .... Elisa León Jiménez
 2010 – El Clon .... Natalia Ferrer Antonelli
 2010 – Rosario Tijeras ....Leticia De Bedut
 2009 – El penultimo beso ....Clara de Luna Izquierdo Preciado
 2008 – Victoria....Mariana Mendoza
 2007 – Pura sangre ....Irene Lagos (Joven)
 2007 – Pocholo ....Sara Larrea
 2006 – Amores de mercado ....Natalia Álamo
 2005 – Juegos prohibidos ....
 2005 – Juego limpio ....Cecilia Patricia "Patico" González
 2004 – Padres e hijos ....
 1999 – Francisco el matemático.... Danae "La Mutante"

References

Colombian telenovela actresses
Colombian television actresses
1989 births
Living people
21st-century Colombian actresses